Auburn was an unincorporated community in rural Baker County, Oregon, United States, now considered a ghost town.  Auburn lies off Oregon Route 7 southwest of Baker City and east of McEwen on the edge of the Blue Mountains.

Auburn is deserted today, but the former gold mining boomtown was once the largest community in Eastern Oregon. Auburn only had one or two buildings until 1861, when gold was discovered in the area. By September 1862, Auburn had grown into a full-fledged town with over 20 stores and 1000 homes to serve the mining industry. In that month the Oregon Legislative Assembly made Auburn the first county seat of Baker County, but by the 1870s Auburn was largely deserted, with a population of 200 people in 1873.

The post office, the first in northeast Oregon, closed in 1903. It had opened on November 1, 1862, with William F. McCrary as the first postmaster.

See also
List of ghost towns in Oregon

References

Further reading
Bright, Verne. "Blue Mountain Eldorados: Auburn, 1861." Oregon Historical Quarterly 62, 1961: 213-236
McLoughlin, Virginia Duffy. "Cynthia Stafford and the Lost Mining Town of Auburn." Oregon Historical Quarterly 98, 1997: 6-55

External links

Ghost towns in Oregon
Former populated places in Baker County, Oregon
Populated places established in 1861
1861 establishments in Oregon
Former county seats in Oregon